The 1919–20 season was the 47th season of competitive football in Scotland and the 30th season of the Scottish Football League. The number of teams in the Scottish League was increased from 18 to 22. Those clubs who were asked to retire for geographical reasons at the end of the 1916–17 season – Aberdeen, Dundee and Raith Rovers – returned, while Albion Rovers were elected.

Scottish Football League

Champions: Rangers

Scottish Cup

Kilmarnock were winners of the Scottish Cup after a 3–2 final win over Albion Rovers.

Other honours

National

County

. *replay

Highland League

Junior Cup

Parkhead were winners of the Junior Cup after a 2–0 win over Cambuslang Rangers in the final.

Scotland national team

Key:
 (H) = Home match
 (A) = Away match
 BHC = British Home Championship

See also
1919–20 Aberdeen F.C. season

Notes and references

External links
Scottish Football Historical Archive

 
Seasons in Scottish football